The men's club throw at the 2019 World Para Athletics Championships was held in Dubai on 9 November (F32) and 10 November (F51).

Medalists

Detailed results

F32 

The event was held on 9 November.

F51 

The event was held on 10 November.

See also 
List of IPC world records in athletics

References 

club throw
2019 in men's athletics
Club throw at the World Para Athletics Championships